Evan Morgan is a Canadian filmmaker and screenwriter. He is most noted for his 2020 film The Kid Detective, for which he was a Canadian Screen Award nominee for Best Original Screenplay at the 9th Canadian Screen Awards in 2021.

Morgan was previously credited as a writer and producer of Matt Johnson's 2013 film The Dirties, and as writer of Sol Friedman's 2014 animated short Day 40. He wrote and directed the short films The Pedestrian Jar (2011) and A Pretty Funny Story (2012), and directed July Talk's music video for "The Garden".

References

External links

21st-century Canadian screenwriters
21st-century Canadian male writers
Canadian male screenwriters
Canadian film directors
Canadian film producers
Canadian music video directors
Living people
Canadian film editors
Year of birth missing (living people)